St. Croix Johnstone (1887-1911) was an American early aviator who died in an airplane accident at the 1911 Chicago International Aviation Meet. A Chicago native, Johnstone was a chauffeur before becoming an aviator. His father tried to discourage him from taking up flying. He died at the same Air Meet that William R. Badger crashed at. Johnstone flew a Moisant monoplane, an American version of the Bleriot XI built under license in the United States. At 500 feet, Johnstone plummeted into Lake Michigan and drowned.

He is not related to fellow aviator Ralph Johnstone, who died in a crash the year before.

References

External links

Early Aviators St. Croix Johnstone

1887 births
1911 deaths
Aviators from Illinois
Accidental deaths in Illinois
Victims of aviation accidents or incidents in the United States
People from Chicago
Deaths by drowning in the United States